Buğulu is a village in the Tunceli District, Tunceli Province, Turkey. The village is populated by Kurds of the Kurêşan tribe and had a population of 168 in 2021.

The hamlets of Akoluk, Aşağıtarlacık, Bölmeli, Dallı, Doğanca, Güllü, Hacı, Kalemdüzü, Kurutlu, Subaşı, Tosuncuk, Yayıklı and Yukarıtarlacık are attached to the village.

References 

Villages in Tunceli District
Kurdish settlements in Tunceli Province